The Northern Corridor Transit and Transport Coordination Authority (NCTTCA) is an intergovernmental body, encompassing six countries in Eastern Africa, tasked with the job of coordinating transport infrastructure improvements.

The Northern Corridor includes the Port of Mombasa, the international road network, rail networks, inland waterways and pipeline transport. The core element of the Northern Corridor is the port of Mombasa, the largest port in Kenya, which connects Kenya and five other landlocked countries to the sea and with the world economy. The six countries covered by the NCTTCA are Kenya, Uganda, Rwanda, Burundi, South Sudan and the Democratic Republic of the Congo. The Northern corridor also serves northern Tanzania and parts of Ethiopia.

Location
The headquarters of the NCTTCA and the organization's Permanent Secretariat are located at House 1196, Links Road, in Nyali, a neighborhood with Mombasa, the largest port and second-largest city of Kenya. The geographical coordinates of the Authority headquarters are 04°02'59.0"S, 39°41'30.0"E (Latitude:-4.049722; Longitude:39.691667).

Overview
One of its main objectives is to build standard gauge railways connecting Uganda, Rwanda, South Sudan and the eastern parts of The Democratic Republic of the Congo, to the Kenyan port city of Mombasa.

A refined oil products pipeline, carrying jet fuel, petrol and kerosene is also under development. The  pipeline will replace an estimated 700 oil tanker trucks that transport fuel by road between Mombasa and Nairobi, on a daily basis, according to the Kenya Pipeline Company.

See also
 Uganda Standard Gauge Railway

References

External links
 Website of the Northern Corridor Transit and Transport Coordination Authority
 Transport And Trade Facilitation Along The Northern Corridor: Challenges, Experiences And ICT Initiatives Towards A Smart Corridor

Transport in Africa
Rail transport in East Africa
Transport in Uganda
Transport in Kenya
Transport in Rwanda
Transport in Burundi
Transport in South Sudan
Transport in the Democratic Republic of the Congo
Organizations established in 1983